Carl Magne Rønnevig (30 October 1874 – after 1946) was a Norwegian physician and politician.

Rønnevig was born in Haugesund to ship owner Knud Hansen Rønnevig and Karen Margrethe Magnesen. He was elected representative to the Stortinget for the period 1931–1933, for the Liberal Party.

References

1874 births
Year of death missing
People from Haugesund
Liberal Party (Norway) politicians
Members of the Storting